The New England Bowl Series is an annual NCAA Division III post-season college football bowl game series established in 2016 by four New England football conferences (ECFC, MASCAC, CCC Football, NEWMAC) pulling their teams from the ECAC Bowl structure. All four conferences are eligible for postseason play and each of the 27 football-playing institutions is eligible to participate in the New England Bowl series. The criteria used by the commissioners to select the teams will require an overall winning percentage of .667 or higher and will evaluate overall record, conference record, conference standing, head-to-head results, and results versus teams selected for the NCAA Tournament.   

The inaugural game was held on saturday, November 19, 2016, at Gaudet Field (Middletown, Rhode Island), with a victory of Framingham State over Salve Regina. The following year, the bowl was transformed into a series, with three or two bowl games played.

Game results

The 2020 bowls were canceled due to the COVID-19 pandemic.

References

College football bowls
NCAA Division III football